Saeed Al-Hajri may refer to:
Saeed Al-Hajri (bowler), Qatari ten-pin bowler
Saeed Al-Hajri (rally driver) (born 1950), Qatari rally driver